Punjab Dian Lok Gathawan (also spelled as Punjab Diyan Lok Gathawan), the 7 inch, 45 rpm, was the first EP of Kuldeep Manak released by HMV (a subsidiary label of EMI) in 1973. The music was composed by Ram Saran Das and the lyrics were penned by Hardev Dilgir. The record contained one kali, Teri Khatar Heere, while the other three are the folk songs related to the old folktales of the Punjab. Recorded on the mono format, the record was a hit.

Track list

See also 
Ik Tara
Tere Tille Ton

Notes 
 Then, The Gramophone Company of India Ltd. (or HMV), later, Sa Re Ga Ma (RPG group)

References 

Punjabi albums
Punjabi-language songs
Kuldeep Manak albums